Green beans are young, unripe fruits of various cultivars of the common bean (Phaseolus vulgaris), although immature or young pods of the runner bean (Phaseolus coccineus), yardlong bean (Vigna unguiculata subsp. sesquipedalis), and hyacinth bean (Lablab purpureus) are used in a similar way. Green beans are known by many common names, including French beans, string beans (although most modern varieties are "stringless"), and snap beans or simply "snaps." In the Philippines, they are also known as "Baguio beans" or "" to distinguish them from yardlong beans.

They are distinguished from the many other varieties of beans in that green beans are harvested and consumed with their enclosing pods before the bean seeds inside have fully matured. An analogous practice is the harvest and consumption of unripened pea pods, as is done with snow peas or sugar snap peas.

Culinary use 

As common food in many countries, green beans are sold fresh, canned, and frozen. They can be eaten raw or steamed, boiled, stir-fried, or baked. They are commonly cooked in other dishes, such as soups, stews, and casseroles. Green beans can be pickled, similarly to cucumbers.

A dish with green beans common throughout the northern US, particularly at Thanksgiving, is green bean casserole, a dish of green beans, cream of mushroom soup, and French-fried onions.

Nutrition

Raw green beans are 90% water, 7% carbohydrates, 2% protein, and contain negligible fat. In a 100-gram (3.5 oz) reference amount, raw green beans supply 31 calories and are a moderate source (range 10–19% of the Daily Value) of vitamin C, vitamin K, vitamin B6, and manganese. Other micronutrients are in low supply.

Domestication 
The green bean (Phaseolus vulgaris) originated in Central and South America, where there is evidence that it has been cultivated in Mexico and Peru for thousands of years.

Characteristics 
The first "stringless" bean was bred in 1894 by Calvin Keeney, called the "father of the stringless bean," while working in Le Roy, New York. Most modern green bean varieties do not have strings.

Plant 
Green beans are classified by growth habit into two major groups, "bush" (or "dwarf") beans and "pole" (or "climbing") beans.

They generally reach maturity and produce all of their fruit in a relatively short period, then cease to produce. Owing to this concentrated production and ease of mechanized harvesting, bush-type beans are those most often grown on commercial farms. Bush green beans are usually cultivars of the common bean (Phaseolus vulgaris).

Pole beans have a climbing habit and produce a twisting vine, which must be supported by "poles," trellises, or other means. Pole beans may be common beans (Phaseolus vulgaris), runner beans (Phaseolus coccineus) or yardlong beans (Vigna unguiculata subsp. sesquipedalis).

Half-runner beans  have both bush and pole characteristics, and are sometimes classified separately from bush and pole varieties. Their runners can be about 3–10 feet long.

Varieties 

Over 130 varieties (cultivars) of edible pod beans are known. Varieties specialized for use as green beans, selected for the succulence and flavor of their green pods, are the ones usually grown in the home vegetable garden, and many varieties exist. Beans with various pod colors (green, purple, red, or streaked.) are collectively known as snap beans, while green beans are exclusively green. Shapes range from thin "fillet" types to wide "romano" types and more common types in between.

The three most commonly known types of green beans belonging to the species Phaseolus vulgaris are string or snap beans, which may be round or have a flat pod; stringless or French beans, which lack a tough, fibrous string running along the length of the pod; and runner beans, which belong to a separate species, Phaseolus coccineus. Green beans may have a purple rather than green pod, which changes to green when cooked.
Yellow-podded green beans are also known as wax beans.
Wax bean cultivars are commonly of the bush or dwarf form.

All of the following varieties have green pods and are Phaseolus vulgaris unless otherwise specified:

Bush (dwarf) types

Pole (climbing) types

Production 
In 2020, world production of green beans was 23 million tonnes, with China accounting for 77% of the total (table).

Gallery

References

External links 

 Green beans at United States Department of Agriculture

Edible legumes
Pod vegetables
Phaseolus
Thanksgiving food